The 1898 Idaho gubernatorial election was held on November 8, 1898. Incumbent Democrat Frank Steunenberg defeated Republican nominee Albert B. Moss with 48.83% of the vote.

General election

Candidates
Major party candidates
Frank Steunenberg, Democratic
Albert B. Moss, Republican 

Other candidates
James H. Anderson, People's
Mary C. Johnson, Prohibition

Results

References

1898
Idaho
Gubernatorial